There is a small Chilean diaspora in Mexico. According to the 2010 census, there were 5267 registered Chilean citizens living in Mexico, an increase from the 3,848 registered in the 2000 census. Chilean immigrants constitute the fifth largest community of South Americans in Mexico (after Colombian Mexicans, Argentine Mexicans, Venezuelan Mexicans and Brazilian Mexicans) and the fifteenth largest immigrant community overall.

History
The first South Americans who came to an independent Mexico came from Chile and Peru, who passed through the ports of Acapulco and Puerto Ángel for supplies during the height of the gold rush in California in the mid-nineteenth century. Some Chilean and Peruvian migrants stayed and threw culturares roots among the coastal populations of the Mexican south Pacific.

In the summer of 1849, hundreds of Chileans were deceived by American filibusters to have alliances to invade the port of Guaymas, in an attempt to found the Republic of Sonora. The Chileans were taken to the camps, but the Mexican army attacked Chilean vessels and killed many immigrants accused of supporting separatists.

Political asylum
After the coup that overthrew Salvador Allende in 1973, many Chileans fled the political persecution of the dictatorship of Pinochet, seeking political asylum in Mexico, accompanied by Peruvians fleeing persecution carried out by their respective governments. The higher educational level of Mexico provided a platform to protect their stay in the country. 

Many Chileans who sought political asylum, have settled permanently in the country. They have found the same life expectancy at best to proceed with businesses and jobs that have allowed them to maintain a standard of living much better than other Latin American immigrants. Both countries share the Spanish language; their historical origins are common (part of the Spanish Empire). The warmth of the people of the country has allowed them to live peacefully and in total harmony, some marrying and having families of success. There are others who are simply charmed with everything about Mexico and decided to settle in definitively. Without a doubt this is a unique example of coexistence between migrants and local.

Chilean culture in Mexico

Undoubtedly, one of the cultural contributions of Chile on Mexican soil is the Chilean folk, artistic and innovative tradition of the South American sailor expressed and taught in many Guerrero and Oaxaca spaces strongly influenced by this community who arrived during and after independence from Spain.  

Both countries celebrate their respective anniversaries of independence during the same month, being an important link between the two nations.

Although both countries have different mining industries, they have developed to a level that allows it to be profitable and competitive in foreign markets.

The new wave of immigration
Today, the Chilean community in Mexico is one of the largest communities of foreigners in Mexico. The presence of Chileans stands mainly in large urban centers as sportsmen, academics, researchers, students, entrepreneurs and artists. 

It may be mentioned also that in the technology and transport field, both countries share in their capital a metro system in common which was installed by a French consortium as the Santiago Metro and Mexico City Metro have a system trains with rubber tires, both of Alstom technology. In the 80s, when an attack took place in Santiago, the FPMR Concarril I built for Chile a NS88 train of five cars to replace the wrecked train. Both state-owned transport companies share knowledge and strategies to optimize their respective systems. Even CAF, who was winner of a bid in Santiago, designed the NS2007 Train with similarities to the NM02 Mexicano.

Source: Estadísticas históricas de México 2009 and Censo de Población y Vivienda 2010

Notable individuals

Arap Bethke, actor
Olivia Collins, actress
Tito Davison, director
Barak Fever, sports journalist
Luis Gatica, actor
Beatriz Gutiérrez Müller, First Lady of Mexico
Brontis Jodorowsky, actor
Mon Laferte, singer
Natalia Lafourcade, singer
Cinna Lomnitz, geophysicist
Rodrigo Millar, footballer
Gustavo Moscoso, footballer
Andrés Palacios, actor
Carlos Poblete, footballer
Carlos Reinoso, footballer
Rodrigo Ruiz, footballer
Karla Souza, actress
Sussan Taunton, actress

See also

Chile–Mexico relations
Mexican immigration to Chile
Immigration to Mexico

References

Mexico
 
Ethnic groups in Mexico
Immigration to Mexico